James F. Jacoby is an American businessman based out of Atlanta, Georgia. Jacoby is the founder, chairman and CEO of The Jacoby Group, Inc., a synergistic group of operating companies headquartered in Atlanta, Georgia. The nationally recognized Jacoby Development, Inc., a land development company that specializes in environmentally sensitive multi-use properties and reclamation of impaired sites brownfields is a member of the group.

Early life
Jacoby was born in 1943 in Miami, Florida, the fourth and youngest child of Phebe and Dewey Jacoby. From an early age, he showed interest in all facets of math and business, and was the most entrepreneurial of his siblings.
After high school he served in the Naval Security Group, a U.S. Navy intelligence unit, from 1961 to 1969, during which he was stationed in the Philippines, Germany and the United States.  After serving in the military, he attended Miami-Dade Community College and subsequently moved to Atlanta, Georgia.

Career
In 1973 Jacoby launched his entrepreneurial career in real estate scouting and assembling sites for developing and redeveloping various projects. Jacoby developed multiple retail projects and began a relationship with Wal-Mart in the late 1970s. This relationship lead to the formation of what would eventually become Jacoby Development, Inc. and the development of 40 Wal-Mart anchored shopping centers on the East Coast throughout his career.

Describing his feelings as a crisis of consciousness, Jacoby realized that his goal was to build more than just shopping centers; he was interested in creating healthy communities that would last for years to come. A visionary, Jacoby began focusing on environmentally-friendly and long-term sustainable development before it became a trend.

In 1997, Jacoby contracted the site of the former Atlantic Steel mill in Atlanta, Georgia in partnership with AIG and in 1999 they collectively built Atlantic Station, now widely used as a case study for successful transformation of a brownfield site to a LEED certified campus. Atlantic Station was the first LEED certified campus in the U.S. and includes offices, retail, residences, hotel, a major grocery store, restaurants, a movie theater, and more.  During the ten years required for creating this livable and workable space, Jacoby took on the cleaning of the former steel mill site, and laid out the infrastructure, including a bridge across I-75 and I-85 to connect Atlantic Station with the east side of Midtown Atlanta.

In 2001 Jim acquired the aging Marineland property just south of St. Augustine, Florida. Originally built in 1938 to film underwater scenes and movies, Marineland morphed into a Florida tourist attraction featuring aquatic life exhibits and dolphin shows. After it was damaged by a hurricane, Jacoby acquired the dolphin attraction as well as related real estate and redeveloped the entire park to a modern dolphin facility focused on education and animal/human interaction, and formed an operating partnership with the Georgia Aquarium. Marineland reopened in 2006 with new programs and experiences available to the public. On New Year's Day, 2011, Jacoby sold Marineland to the Georgia Aquarium.

A decommissioned Ford Taurus assembly plant in Hapeville, Georgia adjacent to the Hartsfield-Jackson Atlanta International Airport the world's busiest airport, was acquired by Jacoby in 2008.  The plant was demolished and the site remediated, and re-christened Aerotropolis Atlanta. The site has been subdivided, and portions have been sold to buyers, including Porsche and the Atlanta Hartsfield-Jackson International Airport. On November 27, 2012 Porsche broke ground for construction of its new North American Headquarters and driving experience center, located at One Porsche Drive, which will be anchor of the redevelopment.

In 1999, Jacoby acquired a former asphalt production site in Whitemarsh, Maryland. The redevelopment of the site, which included clean-up of contaminated groundwater and soils has become one of the largest brownfield redevelopments in the state of Maryland. The site is now home to a General Motors Allison Transmission plant, a Federal Express regional distribution center, hotel, bank and building materials supplier.

In 2009 Jacoby acquired the Norfolk, Virginia Ford Plant which is envisioned to become a manufacturing and logistics park due to its accessibility from rail, highways and sea. A portion of this was sold to Katoen Natie, a global logistics provider, bringing an estimated 425 jobs to the Norfolk area.

In February 2009 the landfill gas Live Oak project in Atlanta injected its first bio methane gas into the Atlanta gas light company system. Jacoby initiated this project a few years before the first injection and sold the project to a French company in January 2012.

The future Azalea Solar Park will be the largest of its kind in Georgia and is scheduled to open for production in 2013. Located in Washington County, Georgia, the site, acquired in 2012 is currently under development. Upon completion, it will produce 10 megawatts of power from ground-mounted photovoltaic panels.

Business Ventures
Jim's interest in new and emerging industries, including alternative energy, media and the biotechnology industry, has resulted in the founding of several companies.

Currently, Intellimedix and Marine Studios occupy space at Jacoby Group's Atlanta headquarters. Intellimedix is a biotechnology company engaged in accelerated drug discovery and personalized medicine. Initially working on finding treatments and cures for seizure disorders, the company uses computer algorithms and an ion proton gene sequencer to identify gene mutations, repurpose FDA-approved drugs. Marine Studios produces films themed on ocean-based environmental issues.

Former business ventures include Jacoby Energy, a public/private partnership which reclaimed methane gas from Atlanta's Live Oak landfill for use in the Atlanta Gas Light pipeline to serve local energy needs, and helped found Next 3-D, a computer based media company.

Personal life
Jim lives in Atlanta. He and his wife, Jan, are parents of two adult children. Jacoby enjoys SCUBA diving and is an experienced diver who has cataloged dives in Galapagos, Great Barrier Reef, Tahiti and multiple Caribbean sites. He also enjoys fishing, is interested in the marine environment and how underwater species can help in medical research of a multitude of diseases.

Memberships of professional bodies
Jacoby is an active member of the International Council of Shopping Centers. He also sits on the board of directors of the Georgia Aquarium, Guy Harvey Ocean Foundation, Savannah College of Art and Design, and the Hawaii Health Foundation. He served 10 years on the board of the University of Florida Whitney Lab for Marine Bioscience.

Awards
 Best in Atlanta Real Estate Awards Deal of the Year (2012).
 International Seakeepers Society Award (2012).
 Wall Street Journal's Television Enterprise (2010). 
 Deal of the Year “Land” (2010).
 Deal of the Decade “Best Overall” (2010).
 Lindbergh Corporate Award for Balance (2008).
 Georgia Trends Most Influential Georgians (2006).
 Deal of the Year “Visionary” (2008).
 Deal of the Year “Land” (2008).
 Best Parking Structures (2008).
 Georgia Trends Most Influential Georgians (2006).
 Georgia Conservancy Distinguished Conservationist of the Year (2006).
 Atlanta Leadership Trip (2006).
 Atlanta Leadership Trip (2006).
 American Council of Engineering Companies of Georgia Honor Award (2006).
 State Award Engineers Week 2005 Engineering Excellence (2005).
 Georgia State University Hall of Distinction (2005).
 EPA Phoenix Award Grand Prize (2004).
 Argon Award (2004).
 EPA Southeast Environmental Merit Award (2000).

References

External links
 Jacoby Group Official Website
 Intellimedix Official Website

1943 births
Living people
People from Miami
American chief executives
Businesspeople from Atlanta